Liz Gunn (born ) is an anti-vaccination activist and a former television presenter from New Zealand.

Broadcasting career
Gunn was a litigation lawyer before beginning her TV career on the TVNZ show Sunday in 1992. From 1997 she was the first Breakfast newsreader, becoming one of the show's co-hosts (alongside Mike Hosking) in 2001. She unexpectedly quit that role on-air during the year's last episode. By then she had also begun broadcasting on Radio New Zealand. Other television roles included reporting for Holmes and newsreading on TV One. Gunn moved to Australia after her TV presenting days ended in 2002, returning to New Zealand a decade later. She rejoined RNZ until 2016.

Anti-vaccination activism

During the 2020s she became a leader in the anti-vaccination movement in New Zealand, and championed conspiracy theories about the COVID-19 vaccine causing harm. She was a leader and spokesperson in the 2022 protests occupying the New Zealand parliament grounds.

In December 2022 she was the spokesperson for parents who refused to allow their child to have a blood transfusion using blood donations from vaccinated people.

In February 2023 Gunn was arrested at Auckland Airport. Along with a cameraman, she was there to film the arrival of an unvaccinated family arriving from Tokelau. They scuffled with a security guard and were both arrested.

References

External links
Liz Gunn on Youtube
Liz Gunn at 13thfloor.co.nz

Living people
New Zealand television presenters
New Zealand anti-vaccination activists
Year of birth missing (living people)